The 1990 Rhode Island gubernatorial election was held on November 6, 1990. Democratic nominee Bruce Sundlun defeated incumbent Republican Edward D. DiPrete with 74.15% of the vote.

Primary elections
Primary elections were held on September 11, 1990.

Democratic primary

Candidates
Bruce Sundlun, businessman
Francis X. Flaherty, Mayor of Warwick
Joseph R. Paolino Jr., Mayor of Providence

Results

Republican primary

Candidates
Edward D. DiPrete, incumbent Governor
Steve White

Results

General election

Candidates
Bruce Sundlun, Democratic
Edward D. DiPrete, Republican

Results

References

1990
Rhode Island
Gubernatorial